Chah Nasar (also Romanized as Chāh Nasar) is a village in Eshqabad Rural District, Miyan Jolgeh District, Nishapur County, Razavi Khorasan Province, Iran. At the 2006 census, its population was 975, in 241 families.

References 

Populated places in Nishapur County